Brian Patneaude (born August 8, 1974) is an American jazz saxophonist and band leader from Schenectady, New York, with several notable jazz recordings. He has performed throughout the Northeastern United States and Canada, as well as a tour of Russia. He has performed with Alex Torres, Colleen Pratt, Tom Healey, the Erftones, the Empire Jazz Orchestra, Collider, and Joe Glickman. He has had a solo career and leads his own band (ranging from a duet to quintet). He has produced all of his recordings.

Biography

Early life and career
Brian Patneaude was born on August 8, 1974 in Schenectady, New York. He received his bachelor's degree in music education at the College of St. Rose and received a full scholarship to the Cincinnati College-Conservatory of Music at the University of Cincinnati for graduate studies.

While in college, he worked with several ensembles. He performed at the Newport Jazz Festival in Saratoga Springs, New York and toured Russia for two weeks. He studied saxophone with Paul Evoskevich, Rick VanMatre, and Tom Walsh and jazz improvisation with Pat Harbison.

Performing
Patneaude joined the Alex Torres orchestra in 2000. This is a 12-piece salsa, merengue, and Latin jazz band based in upstate New York. While he was part of the orchestra, he recorded three albums with the Elementos, Punto de Vista, and 25 to Life. They toured throughout the United States and Canada, including the Montreal Jazz Festival, the Rochester International Jazz Festival, the Master Musician Festival in Kentucky, Lake Eden Arts Festival in North Carolina, and the Bethlehem Musikfest in Pennsylvania.

In 2001 he joined the Empire Jazz Orchestra, a 19-piece jazz band in which he has played with Jimmy Heath, Slide Hampton, Wycliffe Gordon, Randy Brecker, Rufus Reid, and The Four Freshmen.

Discography

As leader
 Variations (WEPA, 2003)
 Distance (WEPA, 2005)
 As We Know It (WEPA, 2007)
 Riverview (WEPA, 2009)
 All Around Us (WEPA, 2012)

References

External links
 Official web site

1974 births
Living people
People from Schenectady, New York
Jazz musicians from New York (state)
American jazz saxophonists
American male saxophonists
American bandleaders
College of Saint Rose alumni
University of Cincinnati – College-Conservatory of Music alumni
21st-century American saxophonists
21st-century American male musicians
American male jazz musicians